Proalides is a genus of rotifers belonging to the family Epiphanidae.

The species of this genus are found in Europe.

Species:
 Proalides digitus Donner, 1978 
 Proalides subtilis Rodewald, 1940 
 Proalides tentaculatus de Beauchamp, 1907

References

Rotifer genera
Ploima